This is a list of active and extinct volcanoes in the South Sandwich Islands.

References

South Sandwich Islands
South Georgia and the South Sandwich Islands-related lists